Gustav, Landgrave of Hesse-Homburg (17 February 1781 – 8 September 1848) was landgrave of the German state of Hesse-Homburg from 1846 to 1848.

Early life
On 17 February 1781, Gustav was born the fourth son of Frederick V, Landgrave of Hesse-Homburg and his wife, Landgravine Caroline of Hesse-Darmstadt. Gustav joined the Swedish army in service of his godfather King Gustav III, but left soon after in favour of an Austrian regiment. The prince saw action in the early 19th-century battles of Nördlingen, Hohenlinden, Ratisbon, Aspern-Essling, Wagram, Dresden, and Leipzig. His sister-in-law, Princess Elizabeth of the United Kingdom, later wrote that Gustav "gained as much fame and glory on the battlefield as any of his brothers."

In 1818, Gustav married his niece, Princess Louise of Anhalt-Dessau, the same year Elizabeth married his eldest brother Frederick. Gustav and Louise lived at Homburg Castle, and would eventually produce three children: Caroline, Elizabeth, and Frederick. The youngest, Frederick, contracted scarlet fever when two-years-old but recovered. Gustav, Louise, and their children kept to themselves and did little socializing with their sister-in-law, Elizabeth, to her dismay. Their eldest child Caroline married Henry XX, Prince Reuss of Greiz, in 1839.

Reign
In 1846, Gustav inherited rule of Hesse-Homburg from his brother, Philip. In reaction to a petition put forth by his people, in 1848 Gustav emancipated Homburg's Jews, decreeing that "in local and state affairs no difference shall henceforth be made between our Christian and our Jewish subjects." That same year, Hesse-Homburg was one of nine German states that allowed Jews to be elected to Parliament for the first time.

Due to an illness, his only son predeceased him; as a result, when Gustav died on 8 September 1848, he was succeeded by his brother Ferdinand. In 1851, a monument was built in Gustav's honor in Homburg.

Issue
Princess Caroline (1819–1872); married in 1839 to Henry XX, Prince Reuss of Greiz (1794–1859)
Princess Elisabeth (1823–1864)
Prince Frederick (1830–1848)

Ancestry

References

Works cited

1781 births
1848 deaths
Landgraves of Hesse
House of Hesse-Homburg
Knights Cross of the Military Order of Maria Theresa
Grand Crosses of the Order of Saint Stephen of Hungary